Miguel Gual Bauza (15 December 1919 – 3 December 2010) was a Spanish racing cyclist. He won 5 stages of the Vuelta a España throughout his career.

Major results

1945
 1st  Overall Circuito del Norte
1st Stages 1 & 8
 1st Stages 5, 6 & 12 Volta a Catalunya
 4th Overall Vuelta a España
1st Stages 3, 10 & 11
1946
 1st Trofeo Masferrer
 1st Stage 2 (ITT) Vuelta a España
 1st Stages 2 & 5 Volta a Catalunya
 2nd Trofeo del Sprint
 3rd Trofeo Jaumendreu
1947
 1st Circuito de Getxo
 1st GP Pascuas
 1st Trofeo Masferrer
 1st Stage 2 Vuelta a Burgos
 2nd Trofeo del Sprint
 2nd Overall Volta a Catalunya
1st Stages 4, 6 & 8
 2nd Subida a la Cuesta de Santo Domingo
 3rd National Road Race Championships
 3rd National Hill Climb Championships
1948
 1st Stage 2 Volta a Catalunya
 3rd National Hill Climb Championships
 9th Overall Vuelta a España
1st Stages 8, 7, 16 & 19
1949
 1st Clásica a los Puertos de Guadarrama
1950
 1st  Overall Vuelta a Asturias
1952
 1st Stage 3 GP Ayutamiento de Bilbao
1953
 4th Trofeo Masferrer
1954
 1st Stage 3 Vuelta a la Comunidad Valenciana
1955
 1st Stage 7 Volta a Catalunya
1956
 1st Stage 7 Vuelta a Asturias
 4th Overall Euskal Bizikleta

References

External links
 

1919 births
2010 deaths
Spanish male cyclists
Spanish Vuelta a España stage winners
Sportspeople from Mallorca
Cyclists from the Balearic Islands
20th-century Spanish people